Tobias Thorning Jørgensen (born 6 February 2000) is a Danish Paralympic equestrian. In Equestrian at the 2020 Summer Paralympics he won gold in the Individual Test - Grade III event and the Individual Freestyle Test - Grade III event.

References

External links
 

2000 births
Living people
Danish male equestrians
Paralympic equestrians of Denmark
Paralympic gold medalists for Denmark
Paralympic medalists in equestrian
Equestrians at the 2020 Summer Paralympics
Medalists at the 2020 Summer Paralympics
Place of birth missing (living people)